Lamotte-Beuvron is a town and commune of about 5000 inhabitants in the Loir-et-Cher department of Centre-Val de Loire, France.

The French Federal Equestrian Park, one of the largest in Europe, is based in Lamotte-Beuvron. Each July, the Federal Equestrian Park hosts the French Pony Championship, in which more than 15,000 participants compete. It also houses the permanent offices of the French Equestrian Federation and, since 2009, the Bureau of the National Association of the French Riding Pony.

The town is the birthplace of the Tarte Tatin dessert, an upside-down apple pastry named after the Tatin sisters, who created it at their Hôtel Tatin, across the street from the Lamotte-Beuvron railway station.

Lamotte-Beuvron's motto is "Hill yesterday, Mountain tomorrow" (« Motte hier, Mont demain ») which expresses the confidence of the residents in the expansion of the city.

Lamotte-Beuvron is the "sister city" of Paris, Kentucky in the United States.

Geography
Lamotte-Beuvron is located in the natural region of Sologne on the banks of the Beuvron river, about 30 km south of Orléans. It is in the heart of "Grande Sologne," a forested area stretching over 1,930 square miles and containing hundreds of ponds, making the region a popular destination for hunting and fishing. Sologne is one of the richest regions in France in big game (including deer and wild boar) and game birds (including pheasants, doves and pigeons, and woodcocks).

Lamotte-Beuvron station has rail connections to Orléans and Vierzon.

Population

Gallery

See also
 Tarte Tatin
Communes of the Loir-et-Cher department
The works of Jean Fréour Sculptures in St Anne's church

References

External links
lamotte-beuvron.fr Official website

Communes of Loir-et-Cher
Orléanais